This is a list of episodes and movies of all anime adaptations of Kaiketsu Zorori.

Kaiketsu Zorori

The first series, titled Kaiketsu Zorori, is primarily based on the children books by Yutaka Hara.

Majime ni Fumajime Kaiketsu Zorori

Season 1

The second series, titled , differs from the first series in a few ways. It adopts fewer of Hara's books and instead focuses on a season long story arc, something the first series did not have. Season 1 focuses on the wizard Nelly and the mysterious Najō as Zorori, Ishishi, and Noshishi help them restore the magic forest in a magical country.

Season 2
Season 2 of Majime ni Fumajime Kaiketsu Zorori focuses on Puppe's search for the Minus Eel and Zorori's battle with The Legendary Prank King. Unlike the first season, this season is composed of original stories rather than adapting Yutaka Hara's books.

Motto! Majime ni Fumajime Kaiketsu Zorori

Season 1

In July 2019, it was announced that a new television anime series of Kaiketsu Zorori would be released in early 2020. The anime is the first television anime adaptation of the book series in 13 years since the second anime ended in 2007. In February 2020, it was announced to debut on April 5 on NHK E.

The series, titled Motto! Majime ni Fumajime Kaiketsu Zorori, is a joint collaboration between Ajia-do and Bandai Namco Pictures. Takahide Ogata served as director, Atsuhiro Tomioka handled the series' composition, Hideyuki Funakoshi served as character designer, and Kōhei Tanaka composed the music. Kōichi Yamadera performs the opening theme song "Motto! Motto! Kaiketsu Zorori" as Zorori, and ONEPIXCEL performs the ending theme "Shalalala."

Yamadera, Rikako Aikawa, and Motoko Kumai reprised their respective roles. This series marks the debut of Zorori's rival, Beat (voiced by Yūki Kaji).

From May 10 to June 28 of 2020, the show was on hiatus due to the COVID-19 pandemic. New episodes resumed on July 5, 2020, starting with its seventh episode, and ended on November 8, 2020.

Season 2
In November 2020, it was announced that a second season of Motto! Majime ni Fumajime Kaiketsu Zorori would be released in April 2021. In February 2021, it was announced to debut on April 2 on NHK E, with airing day moved from Sunday to Friday evening. On July 14, 2021, it was announced episodes will be postponed due to coverage of the 2021 Tokyo Summer Games.

Season 3
On October 22, 2021, it was announced that a third season of Motto! Majime ni Fumajime Kaiketsu Zorori would be released in April 2022. On February 9, 2022, it was announced to debut on April 6 on NHK E, with airing day moved from Friday to Wednesday evening.

Movies

Tokyo Movie Shinsha

Released in 1993, this movie adapts books 3 and 4. It was shown alongside .

Ajia-do Animation Works

This movie adapts books 38 and 39. It was shown alongside Keroro Gunsō the Super Movie on March 11, 2006. Zorori, Ishishi and Noshishi provide help to Tail on a quest to find the treasure her father Gale died trying to investigate. Along the way, they are helped out by Yōkai-sensei and several monsters, but Tiger and his pirate crew stand in their way.

Based on books 47 and 48. Zorori, Ishishi and Noshishi, while out searching for treasure, come upon a town with a widespread illness. In order to make the secret medicine for it, they must set out on an adventure. This is the first full-length Zorori movie.

Based on book 40. Zorori, Ishishi and Noshishi receive an invitation from their friend, a mother dinosaur, to come see a dinosaur egg that will hatch soon. The group receives a warm welcome when they arrive at the legendary dinosaur island. However, a huge typhoon hits the island and the egg goes missing. Zorori goes on a quest to save the egg and return it safely to its family.

Zorori, Ishishi and Noshishi search for a meteor that sunk in the ocean. When under attack by octopi, Zorori accidentally launches his submarine into space and land on another planet.

Zorori, Ishishi and Noshishi travel back in time and meet young Zororeene.

Based on book 66. Zorori, Ishishi and Noshishi become agents and producers of a promising but troubled singer named Hippopo and help her on her way to stardom.

Notes

References

Kaiketsu Zorori